Pietro Antonio Domenico Trapassi (3 January 1698 – 12 April 1782), better known by his pseudonym of Pietro Metastasio, was an Italian poet and librettist, considered the most important writer of opera seria libretti.

Early life 

Metastasio was born in Rome, where his father, Felice Trapassi, a native of Assisi, had taken service in the Corsican regiment of the papal forces. Felice married a Bolognese woman, Francesca Galasti, and became a grocer in the Via dei Cappellari. The couple had two sons and two daughters; Pietro was the younger son.

Pietro, while still a child, is said to have attracted crowds by reciting impromptu verses on a given subject. On one such occasion in 1709, two men of distinction stopped to listen: Giovanni Vincenzo Gravina, famous for legal and literary erudition as well as his directorship of the Arcadian Academy, and Lorenzini, a critic of some note. Gravina was attracted by the boy's poetic talent and personal charm, and made Pietro his protégé; in the course of a few weeks he adopted him. Felice Trapassi was glad to give his son the chance of a good education and introduction into society.

Gravina hellenized the boy's name Trapassi into Metastasio, and intended his adopted son to be a jurist like himself. He therefore made the boy learn Latin and law. At the same time he cultivated his literary gifts, and displayed the youthful prodigy both at his own house and in the Roman coteries. Metastasio soon found himself competing with the most celebrated improvvisatori of his time in Italy. However, his days full of study and evenings devoted to improvising poetry took a toll on Pietro's health.

Gravina, making a business trip to Calabria, exhibited Metastasio in the literary circles of Naples, then placed him in the care of his kinsman Gregorio Caroprese at Scaléa. In country air and the quiet of the southern seashore Metastasio's health revived. Gravina decided that he should never improvise again, but should be reserved for nobler efforts, when, having completed his education, he might enter into competition with the greatest poets.

Metastasio responded to his patron's wishes. At the age of twelve he translated the Iliad into octave stanzas; and two years later he composed a Senecan tragedy on a subject from Gian Giorgio Trissino's Italia liberata – Gravina's favourite epic. It was called Giustino, and was printed in 1713; forty-two years later, Metastasio told his publisher that he would willingly suppress this juvenilia.

Caroprese died in 1714, leaving Gravina his heir; and in 1718 Gravina also died. Metastasio inherited a fortune of 15,000 scudi. At a meeting of the Arcadian Academy, he recited an elegy to his patron, and then settled down to enjoy his wealth.

Roman fame 

Metastasio was now twenty. During the last four years he had worn the costume of abbé, having taken the minor orders without which it was then useless to expect advancement in Rome. His romantic history, personal beauty, charming manners and distinguished talents made him fashionable. Within two years he had spent his money and increased his reputation. He decided to apply himself seriously to the work of his profession. He migrated to Naples, and entered the office of an eminent lawyer named Castagnola, who exercised severe control over his time and energies.

While slaving at the law, Metastasio in 1721 composed an epithalamium, and probably also his first musical serenade, Endimione (Endymion), on the occasion of the marriage of his patroness Donna Anna Francesca Ravaschieri Pinelli di Sangro (later 6th Principessa di Belmonte) to the Marchese Don Antonio Pignatelli (later His Serene Highness Prince of Belmonte). In 1722, while Naples was under Austrian rule, the birthday of Empress Elisabeth Christine had to be celebrated with more than ordinary honours, and the viceroy asked Metastasio to compose a serenata for the occasion. Metastasio accepted, but kept his authorship secret. He wrote "Gli orti esperidi", which was set to music by Nicola Porpora, and sung by Porpora's pupil, the castrato Farinelli, making a spectacular début, it won the most enthusiastic applause. The Roman prima donna, Marianna Bulgarelli, who played Venus in this opera, spared no pains until she had discovered its author.

Bulgarelli persuaded the poet to give up the law, and promised to secure for him fame and independence if he would devote his talents to the musical drama. In her house Metastasio became acquainted with the greatest composers of the day: Johann Adolph Hasse, Giovanni Battista Pergolesi, Alessandro Scarlatti, Leonardo Vinci, Leonardo Leo, Francesco Durante, and Benedetto Marcello, all of whom would later set his plays to melody. Here too he studied the art of singing, and learned to appreciate the style of such men as Farinelli. Metastasio wrote quickly and his plays were enhanced by being set to music and sung by the greatest singers of the day..

Metastasio lived with Bulgarelli and her husband in Rome. Moved by an affection half maternal, half romantic, and by admiration for his talent, she adopted him more passionately even than Gravina had done. She took the whole Trapassi family – father, mother, brother, sisters – into her own house. She fostered the poet's genius and pampered his caprices. Under her influence he wrote in rapid succession Didone abbandonata, Catone in Utica, Ezio, Alessandro nell' Indie, Semiramide riconosciuta, Siroe and Artaserse. These dramas were set to music by the chief composers of the day, and performed in the chief towns of Italy.

But meanwhile Bulgarelli was growing older; she had ceased to sing in public; and the poet increasingly felt his dependence upon her kindness irksome. He gained 300 scudi for each opera; this pay, though good, was precarious and he longed for some fixed engagement. In September 1729 he received the offer of the post of court poet to the theatre at Vienna, succeeding Pietro Pariati, with a stipend of 3000 florins. This he at once accepted. Bulgarelli unselfishly sped him on his way to glory. She took charge of his family in Rome and he set off for Austria.

Vienna 

In the early summer of 1730, Metastasio settled at Vienna in an apartment in the so-called 'Michaelerhaus'. This date marks a new period in his artistic activity. Between the years 1730 and 1740 his finest dramas, Adriano in Siria, Demetrio, Issipile, Demofoonte, Olimpiade, Clemenza di Tito, Achille in Sciro, Temistocle and Attilio Regolo, were produced for the imperial theatre. Some of them had to be composed for special occasions, with almost incredible rapidity: Achille in eighteen days, Ipermestra in nine. Poet, composer, musical copyist and singer did their work together in frantic haste. Metastasio understood the technique of his peculiar art in its minutest details. The experience gained at Naples and Rome, quickened by the excitement of his new career at Vienna, enabled him almost instinctively, and as it were by inspiration, to hit the exact mark aimed at in the opera.

The libretto Adriano in Siria was used by more than 60 other composers in the 18th and early 19th century: Antonio Caldara (1732), Giovanni Battista Pergolesi (1734), Francesco Maria Veracini (1735), Baldassare Galuppi (1740), Carl Heinrich Graun (1746), Johann Adolph Hasse (1752), Johann Christian Bach (1765), Luigi Cherubini (1782) and in Adriano in Siria (Mysliveček) from (1776).

In Vienna Metastasio met with no marked social success. His plebeian birth excluded him from aristocratic circles. She had lost her husband, and had some while occupied the post of chief favourite to the emperor. Metastasio's liaison with her became so close that it was believed they had been privately married.

Bulgarelli tired of his absence, and asked Metastasio to get her an engagement at the court theatre. He was ashamed of her and tired of her, and wrote dissuading her from the projected visit. The tone of his letters alarmed and irritated her. She seems to have set out from Rome, but died suddenly upon the road. All we know is that she left him her fortune after her husband's life interest in it had expired, and that Metastasio, overwhelmed with grief and remorse, immediately renounced the legacy. This disinterested act plunged the Bulgarelli-Metastasio household at Rome into confusion. Bulgarelli's widower married again. Metastasio's brother, Leopoldo Trapassi, and his father and sister, were thrown upon their own resources.

As time advanced, the life which Metastasio led at Vienna, together with the climate, told on his health and spirits. From about the year 1745 onward he wrote little, though the cantatas which belong to this period, and the canzonetta Ecco quel fiero istante, which he sent to his friend Farinelli, rank among the most popular of his productions. It was clear, as Vernon Lee has phrased it, that "what ailed him was mental and moral ennui". In 1755 the Countess Althann died, and Metastasio's social contacts were reduced to the gatherings round him in the bourgeois house of his friend Nicolo Martinez, the secretary to the papal Nuncio in Vienna. He sank rapidly into the habits of old age; and, though he lived till the year 1782, he was very inactive. He died on 12 April, bequeathing his whole fortune of some 130,000 florins to the six children of Nicolo Martinez. He had survived all his Italian relatives.

Throughout the forty years of his career in Vienna, in the course of which Metastasio eventually outlived his own originality and creative powers, his fame went on increasing. In his library he counted as many as forty editions of his own works. They had been translated into French, English, German, Spanish, and modern Greek. They had been set to music over and over again by every composer of distinction. They had been sung by the best virtuosi in every capital, and there was not a literary academy of note which had not conferred on him the honour of membership. Strangers of distinction passing through Vienna made a point of paying their respects to the old poet at his lodgings in the Kohlmarkt Gasse.

But his poetry was intended for a certain style of music – for the music of omnipotent vocalists, of exceedingly skilled sopranos and castrati. When the operas of Christoph Willibald Gluck and Wolfgang Amadeus Mozart—focusing more on psychology and less on virtuoso singing—came into vogue, a new style of libretto was needed. (Mozart did use an old Metastasio libretto for his renowned opera La clemenza di Tito, but, it was substantially re-written for the purpose.) The demise of castrato singing meant that Metastasio's operas dropped out of the repertory.

Metastasio's poetry is emotional, lyrical, and romantic. His chief dramatic situations are expressed by lyrics for two or three voices, embodying the several contending passions of the agents brought into conflict by the circumstances of the plot. The total result is not pure literature, but literature fit for musical effect. Language in Metastasio's hands is musical, lucid, and songlike, perhaps due to his experience as an improvisatory poet. He was an admirer of Torquato Tasso, Giambattista Marino, Giovanni Battista Guarini, and Ovid.

Composers continued to set Metastasio’s poetry to music even after his death. German composer Georgina Schubert (1840-1878) used his text for her lieder  “Gondoliera.”

Works

Operas 
The names of the first composers to set the respective texts to music are indicated next to the title 

 Siface, re di Numidia (1723) – Francesco Feo
 Didone abbandonata (1724) – Domenico Sarro
 L'impresario delle Isole Canarie (1724) – Domenico Sarro
 Siroe rè di Persia (1726) – Leonardo Vinci
 Catone in Utica (1728) – Leonardo Vinci
 Ezio (1728) – Pietro Auletta
 Alessandro nell'Indie (1729) – Leonardo Vinci
 Semiramide riconosciuta (1729) – Leonardo Vinci
 Artaserse (1730) – Leonardo Vinci
 Demetrio (1731) – Antonio Caldara
 Adriano in Siria (1732) – Antonio Caldara
 Issipile (1732) – Francesco Conti
 Demofoonte (1733) – Antonio Caldara
 L'Olimpiade (1733) – Antonio Caldara
 La clemenza di Tito (1734) – Antonio Caldara
 Achille in Sciro (1736) – Antonio Caldara
 Ciro riconosciuto (1736) – Antonio Caldara
 Temistocle (1736) – Antonio Caldara
 Zenobia (1740) – Luca Antonio Predieri
 Antigono (1743) – Johann Adolph Hasse
 Ipermestra (1744) – Johann Adolph Hasse
 Attilio Regolo (1750) – Johann Adolph Hasse
 Il re pastore (1751) – Giuseppe Bonno
 L'eroe cinese (1752) – Giuseppe Bonno
 Nitteti (1756) – Nicola Conforto
 Il trionfo di Clelia (1762) – Johann Adolph Hasse
 Romolo ed Ersilia (1765) – Johann Adolph Hasse
 Ruggiero (1771) – Johann Adolph Hasse

Other stage works 

 Giustino (1712)
 Angelica (1720)
 Endimione (1721)
 Gli orti esperdi (1721)
 La Galatea (1722)
 La contesa de' numi (1729)
 Il tempio dell'Eternità (1731)
 Amor prigioniero (1732)
 L'asilo d'Amore (1732)
 Il palladio conservato (1735)
 Il sogno di Scipione (1735)
 Le cinesi (1735)
 Le grazie vendicate (1735)
 Il Parnaso accusato e difeso (1738)
 La pace fra la virtù e la bellezza (1738)
 Astrea placata (1739)
 Il natale di Giove (1740)
 Il vero omaggio (1743)
 Augurio di felicità (1749)
 La rispettosa tenerezza (1750)
 L'isola disabitata (1753)
 Tributo di rispetto e d'amore (1754)
 La gara (1755)
 Il sogno (1756)
 La ritrosia disarmata (1759)
 Alcide al bivio (1760)
 L'Atenaide (Gli affetti generosi) (1762)
 Egeria (1764)
 Il Parnaso confuso (1765)
 Il trionfo d'Amore (1765)
 La corona (1765)
 La pace fra le tre dee (1765)
 Partenope (1767)
 L'ape (n.d.)

 Oratorios 

 Per la festività del santo natale (1727)
 La passione di Gesù Cristo (1730)
 Sant'Elena al Calvario (1731)
 La morte d'Abel (1732)
 Giuseppe riconosciuto (1733)
 Betulia liberata (1734)
 Gioas re di Giuda (1735)
 Isacco figura del Redentore (1740)

 Cantatas 

 Canzonettas 

 A Nice Canzonetta La libertà La partenza La primavera L'estate Palinodia Other works 

 9 complimenti
 33 strofe per musica
 32 sonetti
 4 poemi sacri
 Numerosi testi per arie

 References 
Notes

Sources
 
 Aluigi, Metastasio's Life, (Assisi, 1783), London: Charles Burney, 1796, and others.
 
 Kirkpatrick, David A. (2009), The Role of Metastasio's Libretti in the Eighteenth Century: Opera as Propaganda, VDM Verlag Dr. Müller and Electronic Theses, Treatises and Dissertations. Paper 2883 Florida State University, 2005.  
 Metastasio: His works were published in numerous editions, but his personal favourites were those published under his own supervision by Calzabigi (Paris, 1755, 5 vols.). The posthumous works were printed in Vienna in 1795.
 Neville, Don (1990). Frontier Research in Opera and Multimedia Preservation: a Project Involving the Documentation and Full Text Retrieval of the Libretti of Pietro Metastasio. London (Ontario): Faculty of Music, University of Western Ontario. Without ISBN
 Stendhal, Vie de Haydn, Mozart et Métastase, 1817.

 Further reading 

 
 
 Burden, Michael, "Reading Henry Tresham’s theatre curtain: Metastasio’s apotheosis, and the Idea of Opera at London’s Pantheon", in Cambridge Opera Journal, 31/1 (2019), pp. 26-62. 
 Robert Torre, "Operatic Twins & Musical Rivals: Two Settings of Artaserse (1730)", Discourses in Music, vol. 6 no. 1, (Summer 2006).

 External links 

 Drammi of Metastasio 
 Pietro Metastasio: Drammi per musica 
 Handbook for Metastasio Research
 Pietro Metastasio: Poeta dell'Unità culturale europea 
 Metastasio's works: text, concordances and frequency list
 "Biography: Pietre Metastasio", The Every-day Book and Table Book; or, Everlasting Calendar of Popular Amusements, Sports, Pastimes, Ceremonies, Manners, Customs, and Events, Each of the Three Hundred and Sixty-Five Days, in Past and Present Times; Forming a Complete History of the Year, Months, and Seasons, and a Perpetual Key to the Almanac, Including Accounts of the Weather, Rules for Health and Conduct, Remarkable and Important Anecdotes, Facts, and Notices, in Chronology, Antiquities, Topography, Biography, Natural History, Art, Science, and General Literature; Derived from the Most Authentic Sources, and Valuable Original Communication, with Poetical Elucidations, for Daily Use and Diversion. Vol III.'', ed. William Hone, (London: 1838) pp. 421–24.
 Article: Torre, Robert. "Operatic Twins and Musical Rivals: Two Settings of Artaserse (1730)" Discourses in Music: Volume 6 Number 1 (Summer 2006)
 
 
 
 

1698 births
1782 deaths
18th-century Italian poets
Italian male poets
Writers from Rome
Italian opera librettists
Members of the Academy of Arcadians
Italian expatriates in Austria
Italian male dramatists and playwrights
Wolfgang Amadeus Mozart's librettists
18th-century Italian dramatists and playwrights
18th-century Italian male writers